Mani's Community Established is a Manichaen silk color painting drawn in the coastal area of southern China during the yuan to ming period, depicts the missionary history of Manichaeism and the establishment of its churches in three scenes. The preservation is intact and undamaged. This painting was originally part of a large Manichae silk painting, The drawing technique and artistic style are very similar to "Episodes from Mani's Missionary Work", "The Birth of Mani", "Mani's Parents" and "The Manichean Universe Map". The painting is now in a private collection in Japan.

In Japanese it is called  with Episodes from Mani's Missionary Work being called

Description 
According to the research of the Hungarian Asian religious art historian Zsuzsanna Gulácsi, the content described in this work continues "The Legend of the Holy One", using a method similar to the current collage to present the follow-up missionary history and development of the Manichae Order after its establishment. History, the three scenes are separated by a pattern of clouds and mountains. The upper left picture depicts seven lay people worshiping in a Manichae shrine. Among them are five men, a woman and a child, offering offerings to a statue of Mani sitting on a lotus platform. This Mani statue is dressed in a white robe with red rims unique to Manichaeism, with a green headlight and backlight behind him. Three Manichaean priests in white robes stand on the left and right sides and behind the statue. There are three male musicians playing outside the shrine. On their right, there are three other men holding banners and canopies. It can be seen from this scene that the painting depicts the scene after the Mani church has been established. The statue of Mani shows that he is no longer alive and he has been worshipped as a god by believers.

The scene on the upper right is separated from the scene on the left by a green mountain range and a white cloud with sky blue. It depicts five Manichae laymen wearing green, red, yellow, blue, and white robes, bowing to a judge Greetings, showing their compliance with local laws.

The last scene is located at the bottom left, separated from the top left scene by a river of white clouds. It depicts a tutor wearing a red-rimmed white robe with a green head and four priests behind him. The five people encountered a layman bowing to them as they walked.

Gallery

Excursus 

Eight silk hanging scrolls with Manichaean didactic images from southern China from between the 12th and the 15th centuries, which can be divided into four categories:
 Two single portraits (depicting Mani and Jesus)
 Icon of Mani
 Manichaean Painting of the Buddha Jesus
 One scroll depicting Salvation Theory
 Sermon on Mani's Teaching of Salvation
 Four scrolls depicting Prophetology
 Mani's Parents
 Birth of Mani
 Episodes from Mani's Missionary Work
 Mani's Community Established
 One scroll depicting Cosmology
 Manichaean Diagram of the Universe

References 

Chinese Manichaean art
Yuan dynasty art
Ming dynasty painting